The Nieuport Nie 31 or Nieuport 31 was a single-engine, single-seat monoplane or sesquiplane fighter aircraft designed and built in France in 1919.

Design and development
Though the Nie 31 (it had been flown and subsequently abandoned before the company changed its name to Nieuport-Delage) was technically a sesquiplane, it could equally well be described as a shoulder-wing monoplane with a small foreplane. Its immediate predecessor was the Nieuport Madon, which had an ancillary lifting surface built around the axle of its wide-track undercarriage. The Nie 31 had a narrower-track undercarriage, but the second wing extended outwards beyond the wheels, which were faired into its upper surface; this wing and the axle were joined to the lower fuselage by a pair of near vertical N-form struts.

The main plane was of low aspect ratio. In plan it had a rounded leading edge, straight trailing edge and square tips. Its roots were cut away to allow a better downward view from the cockpit. This was placed ahead of the trailing edge so the pilot looked forward over the wing; he had a faired headrest behind. The Nie 31's upper wing had ailerons but no flaps and was braced on each side by a parallel pair of aerofoil section struts stretching outwards from the bottom of the undercarriage struts. The lower wing had parallel chord and straight edges, providing a lifting surface with about 40% the area of the main plane. Both wings were fabric covered.

The Nie 31 was powered by a  Le Rhone 9R nine-cylinder rotary engine, smoothly and completely cowled. It drove a two-blade propeller. The fuselage, like that of the earlier Nieuport Nie 29, was a smooth wooden monocoque shell of tulipwood, produced by winding thin spiral strips around a mould in a series of alternately handed layers and glueing them together. It tapered to the rear, where an almost delta-shaped tailplane was mounted at mid-height, carrying horn-balanced elevators. The fin was much less broad, with a straight-edged, balanced rudder extending down between the elevators below the lower fuselage, where there was a small dorsal fin.

The Nie 31 was intended to carry twin  Vickers machine guns. A flight test programme conducted through 1919 showed that the Nie 31 had excellent performance, especially given the low engine power, but Nieuport did not proceed with its development as a fighter, however the Nieuport-Delage Sesquiplan was a direct evolution of this design, but powered with a Hispano-Suiza 8 water-cooled V8 engine, and was built specifically for racing.

Specifications

See also

References

Sesquiplanes
1920s French fighter aircraft
 031
Single-engined tractor aircraft
Shoulder-wing aircraft
Cruciform tail aircraft
Rotary-engined aircraft